Linsburg is a municipality in the district of Nienburg, in Lower Saxony, Germany.

Geography 
The municipality of Linsburg lies on the northern edge of the state forest of Grinderwald, about 10 minutes drive south of the county town of Nienburg/Weser.

References

Nienburg (district)